Margaret Collingridge Wheeler, Lady Wheeler (formerly Norfolk; 1916–1990) was an Australian archaeologist who worked at Maiden Castle, Dorset with Mortimer Wheeler in the 1930s and at Jericho with Dame Kathleen Kenyon in the 1950s.  She authored books about archaeology for a general audience.

Biography
Born in Sydney, Australia, Collingridge went to England to be educated. She joined the excavation team at Maiden Castle, Dorset where Mortimer Wheeler and his first wife Tessa Wheeler were directing the examination of the Iron Age British hill fort. Several other notable women archaeologists took part in this excavation, including Veronica Seton-Williams, Joan du Plat Taylor, Rachel Maxwell-Hyslop, and Margot Eates.

She joined Wheeler's excavation at Camp d'Artus near Huelgoat, Finistère,  Brittany in 1938 and subsequent explorations in Normandy in 1939. Wheeler's biographer Jacquetta Hawkes noted that Wheeler had developed romantic feelings for Collingridge by this stage, although he married Mavis de Vere Cole in 1939, three years after the death of his first wife Tessa.

Margaret Collingridge joined the ATS during the Second World War and learned range-finding. She met a childhood friend, Robert Norfolk, a submarine commander, whom she married. In 1941, Norfolk's submarine HMS Thorn went down in the Eastern Mediterranean.  Margaret Norfolk married Sir Mortimer Wheeler in 1945 when Wheeler was Director-General of Archaeology in India. She travelled extensively with Wheeler to sites in India, Iran and Afghanistan.

In 1954, Margaret joined Dame Kathleen Kenyon's excavations at Jericho. Her book Walls of Jericho (1956) describes the excavation and personnel. She followed its publication with A Book of Archaeology and A Second Book of Archaeology. Her obituary in The Times noted her reputation for producing popular books on the discipline.

References

Sources
Carr, L. 2012. Tessa Verney Wheeler: Women and Archaeology Before World War Two. Oxford: Oxford University Press.
Cornwall, T. 1958. Digging Without Malice. The New Scientist. 6 December, pp. 50–51.
Davis, M. 2008. Dame Kathleen Kenyon: Digging Up the Holy Land. Walnut Creek, CA: Left Coast Press.
Hawkes, J. 1982. Mortimer Wheeler: Adventurer in Archaeology. London: Weidenfeld and Nicolson.
Kenyon, K. 1957. Digging Up Jericho. London: Ernest Benn.
Matthews, R. 2003. The Archaeology of Mesopotamia: theories and approaches. London: Routledge.
The Times. 1990. Lady Wheeler. The Times, 26 December, p. 10.
Wheeler, M. 1956. Walls of Jericho. London: Chatto and Windus.
Wheeler, M. 1957. A Book of Archaeology. London: Cassell & Co.
Wheeler M. 1959. A Second Book of Archaeology. London: Cassell & Co.
Wheeler, R. E. M. 1943. Maiden Castle, Dorset. Oxford: Oxford University Press for the Society of Antiquaries.

Australian archaeologists
Australian women archaeologists
1916 births
1990 deaths
20th-century archaeologists
Wives of knights